The Heinkel HD 17 was a military reconnaissance aircraft produced in Germany in the late 1920s.

Design

The Heinkel HD 17 was a conventional single-bay biplane with strongly staggered wings of unequal span braced with N-type interplane struts. The pilot and observer sat in tandem, open cockpits, and the main units of the fixed, tailskid undercarriage were linked by a cross-axle.

Operational history
The Heinkel HD 17 first flew in 1924. In 1926, it was evaluated by the Reichswehr to equip the secret aviation training school at Lipetsk, and was selected in favour of the competing Albatros L 65. Seven aircraft were purchased and used briefly for training until replaced by more modern designs.

Two Heinkel HD 17s were evaluated in 1924 by the US Army Air Service, being modified by Cox-Klemin to use a Napier Lion and Liberty 12 respectively. Designated by Cox-Klemin as CO-1 and CO-2 respectively (Project numbers P-377 and P-379 were allocated respectively), these planes had no provisions for military equipment during evaluation tests, but were rejected by the USAAS and returned to Cox-Klemin.

Specifications (CO-1)

References

1920s German military reconnaissance aircraft
HD 17
Single-engined tractor aircraft
Biplanes
Aircraft first flown in 1924